The kèn đám ma ("funeral oboe") is one of several types of kèn, a double reed wind instrument used in the traditional music of northern Vietnam. It has a conical bore and is similar in construction and sound to the Chinese suona and the Korean taepyeongso, however, its musical context is most comparable to that of the Pi Mon, as it is typically used to perform music for funeral processions. This instrument may also be called "Kèn Hiếu" in certain contexts.

Discography
1999 - Viet-Nam: Musique Funéraire Du Nord (Arion)

See also
Kèn bầu

External links
Photo
Photo

Vietnamese musical instruments
Single oboes with conical bore